Coast is a New Zealand radio network playing a mix of "feel good" hits predominantly from the 1970s and 1980s. The network includes stations in 21 major cities and provincial centres broadcasting from studios in central Auckland, owned and operated by New Zealand Media and Entertainment (NZME).

The Coast network reaches an estimated 315,100 listeners each week. Its format is smooth, with short hourly news bulletins, succinct voice breaks, minimal ad breaks and limited clutter. Its target listener is 40 to 64 years old; has reached their highest-earning potential, owns their own home and spends disposable income on luxury items and travel. The audience is almost equally male and female, with a 52% female skew.

Coast format was launched 26 April 2004.

History

Early years

Coast originally started in Hawke's Bay in 2002, as a local station. The history of this station dates back to 1995 as The Wireless Station broadcasting on 1530 AM and playing music from the 1930s, 1940s and 1950s. The Wireless Station was started/operated by The Wireless Station Ltd for three years from November 1995 and was then leased or sold to Hawke's Bay Media Group in 1998 and re-branded as Goodtime Gold, playing music from the 1960s and 1970s. In 1999 it was renamed simply Gold 1530.

Gold 1530 was leased (or sold) to The Radio Network in 2000 and was re-branded as Jammin' Oldies 1530 AM or JO 1530 in June 2000. In 2002 the station became the very first station under the Coast brand name and in 2004 Coast began producing their programme from Auckland networked back to Hawke's Bay on 1530 AM (then on 1584 AM from 2011), and later to the rest of New Zealand.

Relaunch

The final re-branding of the station was to the current name Coast 1530. In 2004 the station became voice tracked from Auckland in preparation for its launch in the Auckland market on 26 April 2004. The network expanded beyond Auckland and Hawke's Bay to other markets later in the year. Initially, the playlist consisted of music from the 50s, 60s and 70s, with a very small portion from the late 40s.

The network rose to third place in the Auckland radio survey ratings in 2006, just two years after it began. Then programme director Mike Regal credited the station's success to serving the baby boomer gap in the market that had previously been ignored by marketers, advertisers and media companies. He said the station was a fine balancing act between being neither a station for the young or a station for seniors. "We don't want to be too cool and hip with it and risk alienating people, but on the other side we didn't want to sound too old either," he told the New Zealand Herald.

Recent years

In the current radio survey results Coast has 100,000 listeners in Auckland each week and a 5.1% market share, making it the sixth highest-rating radio stations in the highly competitive Auckland radio market.

By 2014 most of the older playlist (pre-1960) had been dropped, and at times more recent artists could be heard, including Adele, as the station moved to a more Classic Hits-type format.

Coast is now a complete FM network after migrating to FM in late 2018 and early 2019 in a number of markets where coverage had previously on been only available on AM - including Hawke's Bay, Whangarei, and Taranaki.

In 2011 the original 1530 AM frequency leased by The Radio Network and used to start the first Coast Station in Hawke's Bay was returned to its original owners and is being used to once again broadcast The Wireless Station.

Programmes

Coast Breakfast
Coast's Feel Good Breakfast hosted by Toni Street, Jason Reeves and Sam Wallace was launched in May 2020. In January 2021 the show was introduced in Tauranga, Coromandel and Thames, replacing a local breakfast show hosted by Bay of Plenty identity Brian Kelly, the former host of the Coast network breakfast show. The change was made with the move of Kelly to host of GOLD SPORT's breakfast show.

The station's foundation breakfast host was well-known veteran announcer Mike Oliver, who left in early 2011 before passing away from illness in 2014. Oliver had previously worked as a host on Radio Liberty and a voice over artist on Prime TV.

For a period, Hāwera had its own local breakfast show called The 1557 Breakfast. This show was originally aired on Newstalk ZB in the Hāwera region when Newstalk ZB used the 1557 AM frequency. After Newstalk ZB in Hāwera changed to frequency 1278 AM, the show was dropped and replaced with the Auckland-based programme, but it was later picked up by Coast. The 1557 AM frequency in Hāwera has since been reassigned to Hokonui.

Other programmes

Lorna Riley has hosted the weekday time slot on Coast since 2015. The former Easy Mix breakfast host also served as a traffic presenter for Newstalk ZB During more than 25 years in the media industry, she has appeared on Shortland Street and Interrogation and a host of advertisements and advertorials like Family Health Diary. Founding daytime host Jacqui Taite left the station at the end of 2011. Gael Ludlow filled the role in 2012 and Murray Lindsay hosted in 2013. During 2014, the station ran with a day show hosted by Nik Brown.

Coast's Feel Good Drive Home, the afternoon show on Coast, is currently hosted by Jon Dunstan who took over from Jason "JT" Tikao and Mel Homer during 2020. JT and Mel took over in January 2018 when Jason Reeves moved to Coast Breakfast. Reeves replaced Murray Lindsay, formerly the long-running day time host of Classic Hits. Drive has also been hosted by Rick Morin until 2012. During 2013 Southland radio identity John "Boggy" McDowell hosted the drive show after a 33-year stint as host of Southland's Classic Hits 4ZA since 1979. The move had been prompted by a desire for more leisurely mornings and the chance to broadcast to a national audience. He told The Southland Times certain things had "fallen into place that made it a perfect time to move to a new time slot". However, despite dropping his Southland nickname "Boggy", McDowell was moved to Gore's Hokonui radio station in 2014, swapping places with Nik Brown.

Jason "JT" Tikao now hosts Coast's Night Show between 7pm - 12 midnight. Before 2013 the night programme was automated.

Coast weekend programming includes Club Coast on Saturday evenings from 6pm until 2am Sunday morning. Club Coast is a blend of party hits. Double Shot Sundays feature two songs in a row from the same artist. This feature runs every Sunday from 6am until 12 midnight.

Regular weekend hosts include Grant Kereama (former ZM Morning Crew host), James Daniels (also heard on Newstalk ZB weekday afternoons with Simon Barnett), Hamish Denton, Brendon Weatherley and Darren Mills.

Stations

Coast's station group has expanded rapidly since its Auckland launch in 2004. It was initially introduced in coastal markets before being introduced provincial inland markets like Rotorua in 2008.

Frequencies

 Kaitaia - 96.4 FM
 Kaikohe - 96.4 FM
 Russell - 89.6 FM
 Whangārei - 96.4 FM/900 AM
 Auckland - 98.2 FM
 Hamilton 105.0 FM
 Whangamatā - 97.9 FM
 Thames - 107.1 FM
 Tauranga - 97.4 FM
 Rotorua - 96.7 FM
 Gisborne - 88.3 FM
 Napier - 99.9 FM
 New Plymouth - 106.0 FM
 Hāwera - 1323 AM
 Whanganui - 98.4 FM
 Palmerston North - 105.8 FM/1548 AM
 Kapiti Coast/Horowhenua - 95.9 FM
 Wairarapa - 91.9 FM
 Wellington - 95.7 FM
 Nelson - 100.8 FM
 Blenheim - 94.5 FM
 Christchurch - 90.1 FM & 105.7 FM/1593 AM
 Dunedin - 104.6 FM/954 AM
 Wānaka - 94.6 FM
 Invercargill - 92.4 FM

Other services

News

Coast has news, sports, traffic and weather bulletins from the NZ Herald newsroom at the start of every hour, followed by music, comments from the announcers on the music being played and issues of the day.

During breakfast Coast has half-hourly news and sports updates.

During weekend days, there are hourly news and sports updates and weather forecasts.

Promotions

Coast regularly runs competitions and is famous for Coast Stars where listeners win cash by identifying the "stars" saying "Love the music - Coast".

iHeartRadio

Coast's network stream is also available on the iHeartRadio website and app.

References

External links
 Coast Official Website
 Corporate Website

New Zealand radio networks
Radio stations in New Zealand
Classic hits radio stations
New Zealand Media and Entertainment